Cardedu is a comune (municipality) in the Province of Nuoro in the Italian region Sardinia, located about  northeast of Cagliari and about  south of Tortolì.

Cardedu borders the following municipalities: Bari Sardo, Gairo, Jerzu, Lanusei, Osini, Tertenia.

References

Cities and towns in Sardinia
1984 establishments in Italy
States and territories established in 1984
Populated places established in 1966